Henry Adams (1583–1646) was a British colonial farmer. Also known as Henry Adams of Braintree, he was a patrilineal emigrant ancestor of U.S. Presidents John Adams and John Quincy Adams.

Early life
Henry Adams was born in Barton St. David, Somerset to John Adams (1555–1604) and Agnes Stone (1556–1616). He emigrated from Braintree, Essex in England to what soon became Braintree, Massachusetts in about 1632–1633.

While his descendant President John Quincy Adams believed Henry Adams to have been born in Braintree, Essex, numerous records have shown Henry Adams to have been born and raised in the village of Barton St. David in Somerset, England.

Henry Adams most likely moved to Braintree upon maturity to work for the Hooker company, which then arranged for his passage to America.

Settling in Massachusetts
He was one of the earliest settlers of the Massachusetts Bay Colony. He is likely to have arrived in the area with his wife, Edith Squire (1587–1672/73), his brothers Jeremy Adams ‘’et al.’’, and eight sons and a daughter, in 1632. Braintree was incorporated in 1640, and included what is now Quincy, and Braintree.

Personal life
He married Edith “Rosamund” Squire on 19 October 1609 in Charlton Mackrell, Somerset, England. They had ten children.

Falsified and incorrect genealogies
Genealogist Charles Henry Browning contributed to a bogus lineage for Henry Adams, who immigrated from Barton St David, Somerset, England to Braintree, Massachusetts. Henry Adams’ great-grandfather was a lowly tenant farmer, but, in 1853, a forged document fooled the editors of the New England Historical and Genealogical Register, and the false lineage was republished in 1893 in Browning’s ‘’Americans of Royal Descent’’. The NEHGR has diligently tried to warn its readers about this false lineage disseminated by such as the Register’s 1902 book notice of the Reverend Hiram Fairbanks’ ‘’The Ancestry of Henry Adams of Braintree, New England’’.

It is widely believed that claims Henry Adams (thus, President Adams) is descended from the Welsh political family also called Adams are false.  The Welsh prefix ‘’Ap’’ (meaning “son of”) often appears in the Welsh Adams family but not in the name of the Somerset family.  These mistakes and false assumptions are frequent in early attempts at genealogy.

Legacy
John Adams, the second president of the United States of America, erected a monument to his memory in the old church yard at Quincy with the following inscription: “In memory of Henry Adams who took his flight from the Dragon persecution in Devonshire, England and alighted with eight sons, near Mount Wollaston. One of the sons returned to England, and after taking time to explore the country, four removed to Medfield and the neighboring towns; two to Chelmsford. One only, Joseph, who lies here at his left hand, remained here, who was an original proprietor in the township of Braintree, incorporated in 1639. This stone and several others have been placed in this yard, by a great-great grandson, from a veneration of the Piety, humility, simplicity, prudence, patience, temperance, frugality, industry and perseverance, of his Ancestors, in hopes of Recommending an imitation of their virtures to their posterity. … Erected December, 1823.”

However, President John Quincy Adams dissented from the opinion of his father that Henry Adams came from Devonshire. He believed that: “After giving the matter particular and thorough investigation… my conviction is that Henry Adams was from Braintree in the county of Essex, on the east coast of England.”

Henry may have been in the company of Thomas Hooker, who arrived in September 1633. The Hooker company was mostly made up from immigrants of Chelmsford, perhaps from Braintree and other neighboring villages of Essex county, who had arrived just to the new colony the year before. Winthrop’s Journal, I. 37, says, “1632: 14 Aug; The Braintree Company which had begun to settle down at Mt. Wollaston by order of Court, removed to Newtown. These were Mr. Hooker’s Company.” Hence it appears highly probable that Henry Adams from Braintree in Essex joined Hooker’s Company and arrived in Boston in 1632. Dr. James Savage, author of the Genealogical Dictionary of the early first-comers of New England, concurs in the opinion of President John Quincy Adams.

References

Further reading
“Henry Adams of Somerset, England and Braintree, Mass” by J. Gardner Bartlett
“Ancestors and Descendants of Jeremiah Adams, 1794–1883, of Salisbury, Connecticut, Sullivan County, New York, Harbor Creek, Pennsylvania and Vermilion, Ohio” by Enid Eleanor Adams (1974)

People of colonial Massachusetts
People from Braintree, Essex
People from Braintree, Massachusetts
Kingdom of England emigrants to Massachusetts Bay Colony
Adams political family
1583 births
1646 deaths